YASA is a British manufacturer of electric motors and motor controllers for use in automotive and industrial applications. The company was founded in 2009 by the CTO Dr Tim Woolmer who is also the holder of a number of related motor technology patents. 
Although initial commercial adoption was in high-performance cars, markets for YASA e-motors and generators now include the off-road, marine, industrial and aerospace sectors.

History
YASA Limited (formerly YASA Motors Limited) was founded in September 2009 to commercialise a permanent-magnet axial-flux electric motor (YASA stands for Yokeless and Segmented Armature). The motor was developed for the Morgan LIFEcar in 2008 by Dr Malcolm McCulloch and Dr Tim Woolmer, then a PhD student, at the University of Oxford. In 2015, YASA Motors launched the P400 Series of motors in serial production for volume manufacturers. In January 2018, YASA's 1st series production facility, capable of 100,000 units per year, was officially opened by the Rt Hon Greg Clark, UK Secretary of State for Business, Energy and Industrial Strategy.

In May 2019, the company announced "Ferrari selects YASA electric motor for SF90 Stradale, the company’s first hybrid production series supercar" 

On 22 July 2021 YASA Limited was acquired by Mercedes-Benz.

Products and applications

YASA offer a range of off-the-shelf and custom motors for use in a number of applications such as electric (BEV) and hybrid vehicle drivetrain, power generation and hydraulics replacement systems.

Standard Motors and Controllers 
YASA's standard electric motors have been used in several high-performance cars such as the Drive eO PP03 (the first EV to win the Pikes Peak International Hill Climb outright), Jaguar C-X75, Koenigsegg Regera, and a Lola Le Mans Prototype converted by Drayson Racing, which set a world electric land speed record in 2013.

YASA P400 Series 
The stator of the P400 series motors is oil cooled, and can optionally include additional air cooling.

YASA 750 R 

YASA Si400 Controller 
The Si400 controller delivers 200 kVA from a 5-litre package weighing just . The controller features innovative thermal management including dielectric oil cooling and is suitable for use with induction, permanent magnet and axial-flux electric motors. The Si400 became available for sale on 2 April 2019. YASA launches new series of motor controllers

Custom Powertrain Solutions: E-Motors, Controllers & Integrated Electric Drive Units (EDU) 
As well as standard products, YASA designs and manufactures e-motors that are fully integrated into the drivetrain of their OEM and Tier 1 automotive customers.

References

External links
 

Engineering companies of the United Kingdom
Manufacturing companies of the United Kingdom
Manufacturing companies established in 2009
Electric motor manufacturers
Electric vehicle industry
Electrical engineering companies
Industrial machine manufacturers
2009 establishments in England
British brands